Guinikoumba, also spelled Guénékoumba, is a village located in Haut-Mbomou Prefecture, Central African Republic.

History 
In 2013, an unknown armed group attacked a van that transported vaccines to Zemio 2 km from Guinikoumba. They killed the doctors and the crews and burned the vehicle. Subsequently, the villagers felt threatened by the armed group near their village. They decided to take refuge in a field 15 km downstream from the village. As a result, Guinikoumba temporarily became a ghost town. The residents soon returned to the village.

On 25 April 2015, 17 LRA militias raided Guinikoumba. They looted houses, a school, and a health post and abducted two people. A clash between the local and LRA militia ensued, injuring one LRA militia. The residents fled Guinikoumba and only returned one week after the attack.

Facilities 
Guinikoumba has a health post and a school.

References 

Populated places in Haut-Mbomou